The 2014 Currie Cup First Division was contested between 29 August and 17 October 2014. The tournament (also known as the Absa Currie Cup First Division for sponsorship reasons) was the second tier of South Africa's premier domestic rugby union competition, featuring teams representing either entire provinces or substantial regions within provinces.

Competition

There were six participating teams in the 2014 Currie Cup First Division. A proposed expansion of the Premier Division to eight teams was initially rejected, but was then subsequently approved on 13 February 2014. This meant that the First Division was reduced to six teams for 2014.

Regular season and title playoffs

The six teams played each other twice over the course of the season, once at home and once away. The first series of fixtures were played as part of the 2014 Currie Cup qualification competition, with all results carried forward to the First Division except for the match against the 2014 Currie Cup Premier Division qualifier. A second set of fixtures then followed between the remaining six teams.

Each team received four points for a win and two points for a draw. Bonus points were awarded to teams that scored 4 or more tries in a game, as well as to teams that lost a match by 7 points or less. Teams were ranked by points, then points difference (points scored less points conceded).

The top 4 teams qualified for the title play-offs. In the semifinals, the team that finished first had home advantage against the team that finished fourth, while the team that finished second had home advantage against the team that finished third. The winners of these semi-finals played each other in the final, at the home venue of the higher-placed team.

Promotion

All the teams qualified for the 2015 Currie Cup qualification series, since , a non-entrenched team, finished in the bottom two of the 2014 Currie Cup Premier Division.

Teams

The six participating teams were:

Log

The final log of the round-robin stage of the 2014 Currie Cup First Division was:

The teams' playing records from the 2014 Currie Cup qualification series brought forward to the First Division are as follows:

Fixtures and results

All the results from the 2014 Currie Cup qualification tournament were carried forward into the First Division season. The results against the 2014 Currie Cup Premier Division qualifier were discarded.

Round Eight

Round Nine

Round Ten

Round Eleven

Round Twelve

Title Play-Off Games

Semi-finals

Following the match between the Leopards and the Falcons, the former lodged a complaint with the South African Rugby Union regarding the eligibility of Falcons fly-half Clinton Swart. The Leopards argued that Swart was only eligible for the final two matches of the Currie Cup First Division competition and therefore not eligible to play in the semi-finals. However, SARU Judicial Officer Rob Stelzner SC, ruled that Swart fulfilled the eligibility criteria and rejected the complaint.

Final

Honours

Players

Player Statistics

The following table contains points which have been scored in the 2014 Currie Cup First Division and excludes points scored in the 2014 Currie Cup qualification series:

Squad Lists

The teams released the following squad lists:

Forwards

 Keenan Abrahams
 Gavin Annandale
 Yves Bashiya
 Ryno Coetzee
 Ashton Constant
 Martin Dreyer
 Kelvin Fikster
 Jason Fraser
 Francois Hanekom
 Zandré Jordaan
 Hanno Kitshoff
 Strand Kruger
 Clemen Lewis
 Dumisani Meslane
 Khwezi Mkhafu
 Ulrich Pretorius
 Franzel September
 Chaney Willemse
 Did not play:
 SP Wessels
Backs

 Christopher Bosch
 Jovelian de Koker
 Danwel Demas
 Sino Ganto
 Marnus Hugo
 Morné Hugo
 Richard Lawson
 Earl Lewis
 Christian Rust
 Edwin Sass
 Duwayne Smart
 Albert Trytsman
 Chevandré van Schoor
 Cheswin Williams
 Eric Zana
 Did not play:
 Ryno Conradie
 Arno Fortuin
 Harlon Klaasen
 Nathaniel Manuel
 Tiaan Ramat
Coach

 Abé Davids / Dewey Swartbooi

Forwards

 Ludwe Booi
 Onke Dubase
 Martin Ferreira
 Anthonie Gronum
 Simon Kerrod
 Blake Kyd
 Wayne Lemley
 Athenkosi Manentsa
 Siya Mdaka
 Mihlali Mpafi
 Buhle Mxunyelwa
 Nkosi Nofuma
 Lukhanyo Nomzanga
 Wandile Putuma
 Bryce Rennie
 Rynardt van Wyk
 Lindokuhle Welemu
 Yanga Xakalashe
 Did not play:
 Cheslin Goeda
 Johannes Jonker
 Naythan Knoetze
 Gareth Krause
 Sibulele Nanto
 Siyamthanda Ngande
 Ayabonga Nomboyo
 Anele Sibeko
Backs

 Masixole Banda
 Hansie Graaff
 Ruan Jacobs
 Ntando Kebe
 Bangi Kobese
 Michael Makase
 Makazole Mapimpi
 Lithabile Mgwadleka
 Thembani Mkokeli
 Lindani Ndlela
 Mario Noordman
 Lundi Ralarala
 Joe Seerane
 Oliver Zono
 Did not play:
 Niell Jacobs
 Skhangele Mateza
 Sipho Nofemele
 Siya Pati
 Lolo Waka
Coach

 André Human

Forwards

 Jacques Alberts
 Devlin Hope
 JP Jonck
 Shane Kirkwood
 Ernst Ladendorf
 JP Mostert
 Dean Muir
 Bruce Muller
 Thulani Ngidi
 Friedle Olivier
 Nico Pretorius
 Brian Shabangu
 Dandré van der Westhuizen
 Andrew van Tonder
 Jacques Verwey
 Marlyn Williams
 Did not play:
 Gerhard Engelbrecht
 Vince Gwavu
 KK Kgame
 Riaan Matthee
 De Wet Meyer
 Chris Richardson
 Andries Schutte
 Peet Vorster
Backs

 Coert Cronjé
 Dirk Dippenaar
 Cecil Dumond
 Wayne Gardner
 Kyle Hendricks
 Jaun Kotzé
 Sino Nyoka
 Willie Odendaal
 Jaco Oosthuizen
 Arno Poley
 Dewald Pretorius
 Anrich Richter
 Jaco Snyman
 Clinton Swart
 Andrew van Wyk
 Did not play:
 Lukhanyo Am
 Riaan Arends
 Ryan Carmichael
 Angus Cleophas
 Grant Janke
 Sandile Ngcobo
 Etienne Taljaard
 Lenience Tambwera
 Waylon Thompson
Coach

 Johan du Toit

Forwards

 Gerard Baard
 PW Botha
 Jan Breedt
 Rudi Britz
 Wikus Davis
 Chris Ehlers
 Dirk Grobbelaar
 Boetie Groenewald
 Elandré Huggett
 Armandt Koster
 Erik le Roux
 Heinrich Roelfse
 Frans Sisita
 Martin Sithole
 Hannes Snyman
 Nicky Steyn
 Joe van der Hoogt
 Danie van der Merwe
 Vaatjie van der Merwe
 Did not play:
 Mlungisi Bali
 Niell Jordaan
 AJ le Roux
 Henru Liebenberg
 Werner Lourens
 Mayizukiswe Ntshoko
 Kevin Stevens
Backs

 Boela Abrahams
 Franna du Toit
 Werner Griesel
 Colin Herbert
 Tertius Maarman
 Vuyo Mbotho
 Aubrey McDonald
 Japie Nel
 Norman Nelson
 Ossie Nortjé
 Wynand Pienaar
 Louis Strydom
 Vink van der Walt
 Did not play:
 Pieter-Steyn de Wet
 Joubert Engelbrecht
 Sheldon Erasmus
 Cameron Jacobs
 Inus Kritzinger
 Bren Marais
 Shaun Prins
Coach

 Oersond Gorgonzola

Forwards

 Stoof Bezuidenhout
 Molotsi Bouwer
 Deon Carney
 Marius Fourie
 Morné Hanekom
 John-Roy Jenkinson
 Danie Jordaan
 Juan Language
 JC Oberholzer
 Francois Robertse
 Joe Smith
 HP Swart
 PJ Uys
 Schalk van Heerden
 Ruan Venter
 Jacques Vermaak
 Rhyk Welgemoed
 Johan Wessels
 Did not play:
 Jaco Buys
 Stompie de Wet
 Arno Ebersohn
 Robert Kruger
 Armandt Liebenberg
 Mash Mafela
 Edgar Marutlulle
 Stairs Mhlongo
 Lucky Ngcamu
 SJ Niemand
 Siya November
 Henri Scharneck
 Brendon Snyman
 Akker van der Merwe
 Elardus Venter
Backs

 Rowayne Beukman
 Lucian Cupido
 Kobus de Kock
 Johan Deysel
 Warren Gilbert
 Adri Jacobs
 Sylvian Mahuza
 Hoffmann Maritz
 Luther Obi
 André Pretorius
 Dillon Smit
 Rhyno Smith
 Sergio Torrens
 George Tossel
 Vian van der Watt
 Percy Williams
 Did not play:
 Justin Botha
 Adriaan Engelbrecht
 Tshotsho Mbovane
 Leon Meyer
 Gerhard Nortier
 Wynand Olivier
 SW Oosthuizen
 Jaap Pienaar
 Chriswill September
 Pieter Smith
 Malherbe Swart
 Malan van der Merwe
Coach

 Robert du Preez

Forwards

 Junior Bester
 Ashley Buys
 Layle Delo
 Christo du Plessis
 Dexter Fahey
 Roy Godfrey
 Marcel Groenewald
 Lyndon Hartnick
 Kurt Haupt
 Grant Kemp
 Wayne Khan
 Grant le Roux
 Schalk Oelofse
 Buran Parks
 Davon Raubenheimer
 Shaun Raubenheimer
 Janneman Stander
 Peet van der Walt
 Mzwanele Zito
 Did not play:
 Hannes Franklin
 Raoul Larson
Backs

 Alshaun Bock
 Martin du Toit
 Mzo Dyantyi
 Leighton Eksteen
 Dwayne Kelly
 Hentzwill Pedro
 Daniel Roberts
 Ashwin Scott
 Brian Skosana
 Gerrit Smith
 Elric van Vuuren
 Luzuko Vulindlu
 Clinton Wagman
 Did not play:
 Karlo Aspeling
 Jarryd Buys
 Danie Faasen
 Anver Venter
Coach

 Bevin Fortuin

See also
 2014 Currie Cup Premier Division
 2014 Currie Cup qualification
 2014 Vodacom Cup

References

External links
 
 

2014
2014 Currie Cup